Valle Church is a parish church of the Church of Norway in Lindesnes Municipality in Agder county, Norway. It is located in the village of Vigeland. It is one of the churches for the Lindesnes parish which is part of the Lister og Mandal prosti (deanery) in the Diocese of Agder og Telemark. The white, wooden church was built in a cruciform design in 1793 using plans drawn up by the local Provost Saxe. The church seats about 600 people.

History
The earliest existing historical records of the church date back to the year 1390, but it was not new that year. In 1577, the local parish priest, Peder Claussøn Friis, built a new church on the same site as the previous church. From 1678-1680, the church was enlarged by adding onto the sides, creating a cruciform design. After the new church was completed, the old church was torn down. The new church also had a cruciform design.

In 1814, this church served as an election church. Together with more than 300 other parish churches across Norway, it was a polling station for elections to the 1814 Norwegian Constituent Assembly which wrote the Constitution of Norway. This was Norway's first national elections. Each church parish was a constituency that elected people called "electors" who later met together in each county to elect the representatives for the assembly that was to meet in Eidsvoll later that year.

Media gallery

See also
List of churches in Agder og Telemark

References

Lindesnes
Churches in Agder
Wooden churches in Norway
Cruciform churches in Norway
18th-century Church of Norway church buildings
Churches completed in 1793
14th-century establishments in Norway
Norwegian election church